The following elections occurred in the year 1931.

Africa 
 1931 Liberian general election

Asia
 1931 Ceylonese State Council election
 1931 Philippine House of Representatives elections
 1931 Philippine Senate elections

Europe

 1931 Luxembourgian legislative election
 1931 Norwegian local elections
 1931 Spanish general election
 1931 Swiss federal election
 Antanas Smetona re-elected

United Kingdom
 1931 Ashton-under-Lyne by-election
 1931 Gateshead by-election
 1931 United Kingdom general election
 1931 Guildford by-election
 1931 Islington East by-election
 List of MPs elected in the 1931 United Kingdom general election
 1931 Liverpool Wavertree by-election
 1931 Salisbury by-election
 1931 Westminster St George's by-election

United Kingdom local

English local
 1931 Bermondsey Borough election
 1931 Southwark Borough election

North America

Canada
 1931 Edmonton municipal election
 1931 Ottawa municipal election
 1931 Prince Edward Island general election
 1931 Quebec general election
 1931 Toronto municipal election
 1931 Yukon general election

South America 
 1931 Argentine general election
 1931 Chilean presidential election
 1931 Guatemalan general election
 1931 Salvadoran general election

Oceania
 1931 New Zealand general election

Australia
 1931 Australian federal election
 1931 Tasmanian state election

See also
 :Category:1931 elections

1931
Elections